Faisalabad Dry Port railway station is located  away from Faisalabad city in Faisalabad district of Punjab province of the Pakistan.

Faisalabad Dry Port railway station is primarily a cargo station as most of the export products from Faisalabad to Karachi sea port move through this station. Also major imports from Karachi are also handled here. The facilities at the railway station include large cargo storage, cargo movement, cargo docking & un-docking and cold storage.

Faisalabad Dry Port railway station is also used for passengers on one platform only.

See also
 List of railway stations in Pakistan
 Pakistan Railways

References

External links

Railway stations in Faisalabad District
Railway stations on Khanewal–Wazirabad Line